The men's high jump at the 1974 European Athletics Championships was held in Rome, Italy, at Stadio Olimpico on 3 and 4 September 1974.

Medalists

Results

Final
4 September

Qualification
3 September

Participation
According to an unofficial count, 30 athletes from 15 countries participated in the event.

 (3)
 (2)
 (1)
 (1)
 (3)
 (2)
 (3)
 (3)
 (1)
 (2)
 (3)
 (2)
 (2)
 (1)
 (1)

References

High jump
High jump at the European Athletics Championships